The Journal of Holistic Nursing, or JHN for short, is a peer-reviewed nursing journal, published by SAGE Publications. The journal was established in 1983 and aims to facilitate integration of holistic perspectives of holistic nursing with traditional Western medicine. It is an official journal of the American Holistic Nurses Association.

Mission
Incorporating the concepts of self-care, wellness, and preventive intervention into your everyday practice. Implementation of intuitive of self-care, wellness, and preventive intervention that you can incorporate into your everyday practice to continue your personal and professional transformation of different approaches that pertain to both patient care and lifestyle that will help you sharpen your skills and become more clinically competent of intuitive as well as analytic skills.

Abstracting and indexing 
The Journal of Holistic Nursing is abstracted and indexed by CINAHL, MEDLINE, ProQuest, SafetyLit, and Scopus.

References

External links 
 
 American Holistic Nurses Association

Publications established in 1983
General nursing journals
Quarterly journals
SAGE Publishing academic journals
English-language journals
Alternative and traditional medicine journals